This is a list of notable tattoo artists.

References

Tattoo
 List